Monterrey is the capital and largest city of the northeastern state of Nuevo León, Mexico, and the second largest city in Mexico behind Mexico City. Located at the foothills of the Sierra Madre Oriental, the city is anchor to the Monterrey metropolitan area, the second-largest in Mexico with an estimated population of 5,341,171 people as of 2020 and the second most productive metropolitan area in Mexico with a GDP (PPP) of US$140 billion in 2015. According to the 2020 census, the city itself has a population of 1,142,194.

Monterrey is one of the most livable cities in Mexico, and a 2018 study found that suburb San Pedro Garza García is the city with the best quality of life in Mexico. It serves as a commercial center of northern Mexico and is the base of many significant international corporations. Its purchasing power parity-adjusted GDP per capita is considerably higher than the rest of Mexico's at around US$35,500, compared to the country's US$18,800. It is considered a Beta World City, cosmopolitan and competitive. Rich in history and culture, it is one of the most developed cities in Mexico.

As an important industrial and business center, the city is also home to many Mexican companies, including Arca Continental, Grupo Avante, Lanix Electronics, Ocresa, Cemex, Vitro, OXXO, FEMSA, DINA S.A., Gamesa, Cuauhtémoc Moctezuma Brewery, and Grupo ALFA. Multiple international companies, including Cognizant, Siemens, Accenture, MSCI, Ternium, Sony, Toshiba, Carrier, Whirlpool, Samsung, Toyota, Babcock & Wilcox, Daewoo, British American Tobacco, Nokia, Dell, Boeing, HTC, General Electric, Johnson Controls, LG, SAS Institute, Grundfos, Danfoss, Qualfon and Teleperformance, also have regional offices in Monterrey.

The uninterrupted settlement of Monterrey was founded by Diego de Montemayor in 1596. In the years after the Mexican War of Independence, Monterrey became an important business center. With the establishment of Fundidora Monterrey, the city has experienced great industrial growth.

History

Prehispanic history
Before the European foundation of the city, there was no established nation-state, and the population consisted of some indigenous semi-nomadic groups. Carved stone and cave painting in surrounding mountains and caves have allowed historians to identify four major groups in present-day Monterrey: Azalapas, Huachichiles, Coahuiltecos and Borrados.

Foundation

In the 16th century, the valley in which Monterrey sits was known as the Extremadura Valley, an area largely unexplored by the Spanish colonizers. The first expeditions and colonization attempts were led by conquistador Alberto del Canto, who named the city Santa Lucia, but they were unsuccessful because the Spanish were attacked by the natives and fled. The Spanish expeditionary Luis Carvajal y de la Cueva negotiated with King Philip II of Spain to establish a territory in northern New Spain that would be called Nuevo León, the "New Kingdom of León". In 1580, he arrived in the newly granted lands but it was not until 1582 that he established a settlement called San Luis Rey de Francia (named for Saint Louis IX of France) within present-day Monterrey. The New Kingdom of León extended westward from the port of Tampico to the limits of Nueva Vizcaya ("New Biscay", now State of Chihuahua), and around 1,000 kilometers northward. For eight years Nuevo León was abandoned and uninhabited, until a third expedition of 13 families led by conquistador Diego de Montemayor founded Ciudad Metropolitana de Nuestra Señora de Monterrey ("Metropolitan City of Our Lady of Monterrey") on September 20, 1596, next to a water spring called Ojos de Agua de Santa Lucia, where the Museum of Mexican History and Santa Lucía riverwalk are now. The new city's name was chosen to honor the wife of Gaspar de Zúñiga, 5th Count of Monterrey, ninth Viceroy of New Spain, and was thus indirectly named after the municipality of Monterrei in Galicia, Spain.

Monterrey's Coat of Arms shows an Indian throwing an arrow to the sun in front of Cerro de la Silla mountain. This represents a native ceremony performed at sunrise. During the years of Spanish rule, Monterrey remained a small city, and its population varied from a few hundred to only dozens. The city facilitated trade between San Antonio (now in Texas), Tampico and from Saltillo to the center of the country. Tampico's port brought many products from Europe, while Saltillo concentrated the Northern Territories' trade with the capital, Mexico City. San Antonio was the key trade point with the northern foreign colonies (British and French).

After Mexican Independence (19th century)

In the 19th century, after the Mexican Independence War, Monterrey rose as a key economic center for the newly formed nation, especially due to its balanced ties between Europe (with its connections to Tampico), the United States (with its connections to San Antonio), and the capital (through Saltillo). In 1824, the "New Kingdom of León" became the State of Nuevo León, and Monterrey was selected as its capital. But the political instability that followed the first 50 years of the new country allowed two American invasions and an internal secession war, during which the governor of the state annexed Coahuila and Tamaulipas states, designating Monterrey as the capital of the Republic of the Sierra Madre as it did before in 1840 for the Republic of the Rio Grande.

In 1846, the earliest large-scale engagement of the Mexican–American War took place in the city, known as the Battle of Monterrey. Mexican forces were forced to surrender but only after successfully repelling U.S. forces' first few advances on the city. The battle inflicted high casualties on both sides, much of them resulting from hand-to-hand combat within the walls of the city center. Many of the generals in the Mexican War against France were natives of the city, including Mariano Escobedo, Juan Zuazua (b. Lampazos de Naranjo, NL) and Jerónimo Treviño.

The brewery Cervecería Cuauhtémoc, one of the milestone local enterprises, was founded in 1890.

20th century

During the last decade of the 19th century, Monterrey was linked by railroad, which benefitted industry. It was during this period that José Eleuterio González founded the University Hospital, now one of northeast Mexico's best public hospitals, affiliated with the School of Medicine of the Autonomous University of Nuevo León (UANL). Antonio Basagoiti and other citizens founded the Fundidora de Fierro y Acero de Monterrey.

A steel-producing company that accelerated the already fast industrialization of the city was founded in 1900 and became one of the world's biggest. In 1986, Monterrey hosted several games of the 1986 FIFA World Cup.

In 1988, Hurricane Gilbert caused great damage to the city; the Santa Catarina River overflowed, causing about 100 deaths and economic damage.

21st century
The city has hosted international events such as the 2002 United Nations Conference on Financing for Development with the participation of more than 50 heads of state and government, as well as other ministers and senior delegates from over 150 countries. The conference resulted in the adoption of the Monterrey Consensus, which has become a reference point for international development and cooperation. In 2004, the OAS Special Summit of the Americas was attended by almost all the presidents of the Americas.

In 2007, Monterrey held the Universal Forum of Cultures, with four million visitors. In 2008, Monterrey held the FINA World Junior Championships.

In 2010, Monterrey was hit by another damaging storm, Hurricane Alex which was considered worse than Hurricane Gilbert, with record-breaking rain bringing floods and causing severe economic damage. Damage estimates totaled US$1.885 billion and $16.9 billion MXN. Reconstruction and urban renewal ensued. Recently, the Nuevo León Development Plan 2030 was presented, along with some other metropolitan projects.

In August 2011 the city was the scene of a terror attack on a casino, in which more than 50 people were killed.

In summer 2022, the area experienced a severe drought, and city water service was cut off for several weeks to some areas, and in others limited to six hours a day. The city has three reservoirs; Cerro Prieto Reservoir dropped to 1% of its capacity, and La Boca Reservoir dropped to 8%. El Cuchillo Reservoir remained at 30%, but limited aqueduct capacity led the government to announce in September 2022 a second aqueduct to connect it to Monterrey, with expected completion in July 2023. Heavy rains replenished reservoirs in early September. Controversy erupted over local bottling companies continuing to use well water to export beer and soft drinks during the crisis, though industry uses only 4% of water in Nuevo León, while residents use 25% and agriculture uses 71%. In late September, the governor of Nuevo León declared the crisis over, but asked residents to voluntarily use no more than 100 liters per day.

Geography

Monterrey translated from Spanish to English is "King Mount" or "King mountain", which refers to the city's topography and the large mountains that surround it. The Santa Catarina River—dry most of the year on the surface but with flowing underground water—bisects Monterrey from east to west, separating the city into north and south halves, and drains the city to the San Juan River and Rio Grande.

Monterrey is adjacent to San Nicolás de los Garza, García and General Escobedo to the north; Guadalupe, Juárez and Cadereyta Jiménez to the east; Santiago to the south; and San Pedro Garza García and Santa Catarina to the west. Their combined metropolitan population is over 4,080,329 people.

Monterrey lies north of the foothills of the Sierra Madre Oriental mountain range. A small hill, the Cerro del Topo, and the smaller Topo Chico are in the suburbs of San Nicolás de los Garza and Escobedo. West of the city rises the Cerro de las Mitras (Mountain of the Mitres), which resemble the profile of several bishops with their mitres.

Cerro de la Silla (Saddle Mountain) dominates the view at the east of the city and is considered a major symbol of the city. Cerro de la Loma Larga—South of the Santa Catarina river—separates Monterrey from the suburb of San Pedro Garza García. At the summit of the Cerro del Obispado, north of the river, is the historic Bishopric Palace, site of one of the most important battles of the Mexican–American War.

Natural areas

The mountains surrounding Monterrey contain many canyons, trails and roads that cross deserts and forests and suitable trails are available to the general public. The Sierra Madre Oriental mountains south of the city are included in the "Parque Nacional Cumbres de Monterrey" (National Park), which was added to UNESCO's Man and the Biosphere (MAB) Program of Biosphere Reserves in 2006.

Cumbres de Monterrey includes:
 Parque Ecológico Chipinque, which contains forested areas (oak and oak-pine mainly).
 La Huasteca, west of the city, in the municipality of Santa Catarina.
 El Potrero Chico Climbing Area, north east of the city, in the municipality of Hidalgo.

 Garcia Caves – these caves are situated in Garcia, Nuevo Leon and were discovered in 1843. Inside you can see amazing stalagmites formations and snail fossils.
 Matacanes – can be found in the municipality of Potrero Redondo in Santiago, Nuevo Leon. It is a 10 hrs walking tour in which you can find rappel descents, underground rivers, waterfalls, among other obstacles.
 Hydrophobia Canyon – similar to Matacanes with the only difference this is a 100% aquatic area.
 Cascade Cola de Caballo – a spectacular waterfall in Santiago Nuevo Leon, formed by water that runs down from the mountains of nearby Parque Nacional Cumbres de Monterrey, impressive rock formations and sprawling forests.

Climate

Monterrey has a semi-arid climate (Köppen climate classification BSh). Being inland at a modest elevation, it is one of the warmest major cities in Mexico. Summers are generally hot, spring and fall temperate, and winters mild, with temperatures rarely below freezing. Rainfall is scarce in winter, but more frequent during May through September.

Monterrey frequently experiences extreme weather changes; for example, it sometimes reaches  in January and February, the coldest months. The most extreme weather changes in summer occur with rainfall, which can reduce temperatures significantly, and the temporary absence of the northern winds in winter, which can lead to abnormally high temperatures. Seasons are not well defined; the warm season may start in February and may last until September. In April and May 2011 temperatures reached  or higher, causing fires and extreme heat.

The amount of water that fell was equivalent to the average precipitation for a year. This was about 3–4 times as much rain as Hurricane Gilbert produced in the city on September 15, 1988. The death toll of Hurricane Alex was estimated to be around 20.

Demographics

According to the national INEGI population census of 2010, of the total population of the state of Nuevo León, 87.3% lived in the Monterrey metropolitan area.

The Monterrey metropolitan area is the second most populous in Mexico with more than 5 million. It comprises the municipalities of Monterrey, Apodaca, Escobedo, García, Guadalupe, Santiago, Juárez, San Nicolás de los Garza, San Pedro Garza García, Santa Catarina and Salinas Victoria.

Education

Monterrey has an estimated 3.7% rate of illiteracy. In 2005, of an estimated 983,359 inhabitants above 6 years of age, 36,689 were illiterate. In 2005, the city had 72 public libraries, with 298,207 books available, serving an estimated 478,047 readers.

The Universidad Autónoma de Nuevo León (Autonomous University of Nuevo León, UANL) is the third-largest Mexican university and is ranked by the Reader's Digest-AC Nielsen Survey 2005 as the top public university in northeast Mexico. The UANL system comprises 26 colleges (faculties), 22 graduate divisions, 24 high schools, 1 center of bilingual education and 3 technical high schools. Its medical school is considered one of the most advanced in Latin America.

Monterrey is also the headquarters of the Instituto Tecnológico y de Estudios Superiores de Monterrey (Monterrey Institute of Technology and Higher Studies), which ranked No. 291 at the 2013 QS World University Rankings in Engineering and Information Technology, No. 201 in Social Sciences and No. 279 overall. It also holds a "QS Stars Rated for Excellence" of 5 stars.

The Universidad Regiomontana was founded in 1969 with the support of local leading multinational corporations such as Cemex, Alfa, Femsa, Gamesa, Protexa and CYDSA. It is a private educational institution offering university-preparatory school, undergraduate and graduate programs. It has agreements with more than 350 universities across the globe (such as the recent expanded agreement with Texas A&M International University). It is member of GATE (Global Alliance for Transnational Education) and FIMPES (Federación de Instituciones Mexicanas Particulares de Educación Superior) and its administration holds an ISO 9001 Certification. The university is nationally recognized, so its degree equivalency is comparable to that of a regionally accredited university in the United States. The university is dedicated to educating students in an atmosphere of freedom and humanism, and providing students hands-on experience in their field of study. Its urban campus further stimulates the city's vibrant economy and attracts working professionals who complement and enrich the academic experience.

The Universidad de Monterrey was founded by the religious congregations of the Sisters of Immaculate Mary of Guadalupe, the nuns of the Sacred Heart and the Marist and La Salle brothers, all of them supported by an association of Catholic citizens.

Health

Monterrey generally has a very highly ranked medical infrastructure with some internationally acclaimed hospitals,
including three with Joint Commission accreditation.
The Joint Commission is a private healthcare accreditation group. There are both public and private hospitals. The Mexican Social Security Institute (IMSS) has two major regional hospitals in the city, the Specialties Regional Hospital # 33, the cardiac centre (Hospital #34), and the Gynecology and Obstetrics Regional Hospital, serving also the northeastern states of Coahuila and Tamaulipas. Several smaller IMSS hospitals can be found such as the Traumatology and Orthopedics Hospital and the General Hospital # 25. State government owns the Metropolitan Hospital, located in the suburb of San Nicolás de los Garza and the Hospital of the Children and Mother Care in Guadalupe suburb.

The Autonomous University of Nuevo León runs the public University Hospital, with a high-level shock-trauma unit and a specialized clinic for child cancer treatment. It is recognized as the best public hospital in the northeast of Mexico and the UANL School of Medicine as one of the best in the country. On the other hand, the Tecnológico de Monterrey runs the Hospital San José-Tec de Monterrey private hospital.

Monterrey has healthcare standards above the average for Mexico. It has several hospitals, including Hospital Cima (formerly Santa Engracia) of the International Hospital Corporation. Its convenient location, low prices and quality of medical care have made of Monterrey a very popular medical tourism destination for United States patients.

Governance

Monterrey and its metropolitan area are municipalities governed by a democratically elected Presidente Municipal (Municipal President), or mayor, for a period of three years. The political environment is one of civility and in the last decade political parties have been alternating office. The current mayor of Monterrey is Luis Donaldo Colosio Riojas.

The City Council of Monterrey (Cabildo de Monterrey) is an organ integrated by the mayor, the Regidores and the Síndicos. The mayor is the executor of the determinations of the City Council and the person directly in charge of public municipal administration. The Regidores represent the community and collectively define city policies. The Síndicos are in charge of watching and legally defending city interests, as well as of monitoring the treasury and the municipal patrimony.

The political parties with representation in the city are the Institutional Revolutionary Party or PRI, the National Action Party or PAN, the Party of the Democratic Revolution or PRD, the Labor Party or PT, the Green Party, Citizens' Movement, Socialdemocratic Party and Nueva Alianza.

Public safety

In 2005, Monterrey was ranked one of the safest cities in Mexico, and one of the two safest in 2006. But since 2008 it has experienced violence related to turf battles between warring drug cartels. The year 2011 was the most violent in history. Drug dealers are a major concern, although military offensives and police captures of important drug-cartel chiefs have weakened cartels trying to settle in the city. The city is safe to travel by day and night. In 2019, cartels were still fighting for control of the city, potentially making Monterrey dangerous.

There are two police departments in the city, the Police of the City of Monterrey (locally known as the Policía Regia), dependent on the municipal government, and the State Public Safety. The Policía Regia protects the city's downtown and main areas, while the State Public Safety is in charge of remoter areas. Since the 2011 attack on the Casino Royale, security has been reinforced by military and federal police.

Infrastructure

Transportation 

Monterrey is connected with the United States–Mexico border, the sea and inland Mexico through different roads, including the Carretera Nacional (also known as the Panamerican Highway) that runs from Nuevo Laredo to Mexico City and south, and the Carretera Interoceánica connecting Matamoros with the port of Mazatlán on the Pacific; it is also crossed by highways 40, 45, 57. The divided highway Monterrey-Saltillo-Matehuala-Mexico City is the main land corridor to interior Mexico.

There are several between-cities bus lines at the bus station downtown. There are arrivals and departures into deeper Mexico, to the U.S. border and into the United States. Monterrey is also connected by at least three important railroad freight lines: Nuevo Laredo-Mexico City, Monterrey-Tampico, and Monterrey-Pacific (Mazatlán).

The average amount of time people spend commuting with public transit in Monterrey, for example to and from work, on a weekday is 85 min. 25% of public transit riders, ride for more than 2 hours every day. The average amount of time people wait at a stop or station for public transit is 17 min, while 29.% of riders wait for over 20 minutes on average every day. The average distance people usually ride in a single trip with public transit is 9.5 km, while 25% travel for over 12 km in a single direction.

The city has a rapid transit system called Metrorrey, which currently has 2 lines. and a BRT called Ecovía.

The city is served by two international airports: General Mariano Escobedo International Airport (served by major international carriers and moving more than 6.5 million passengers in 2007) and Del Norte International Airport, a primarily private airport.

Monterrey is linked through frequent non-stop flights to many Mexican cities and to key United States hubs (Atlanta, Chicago-O'Hare, Dallas/Fort Worth, Detroit, Houston-Intercontinental, JFK/New York, and Las Vegas). Monterrey is the second most important city for the operating routes of Aeroméxico.

Four airlines have their operational bases and headquarters in Monterrey, Volaris, Aeroméxico Connect, VivaAerobus and Magnicharters. Regarding ground transportation from Monterrey International Airport, taxi services link the airport with the city and charge around US$20 for a one-way ride to the city. From this airport, there is a bus shuttle to nearby Saltillo. Inter-city bus services run daily into the interior, as well as north to the US border and points beyond. A public transportation bus line operated by the Nuevo Leon State Government called the Ruta Express (Express Route) also operates from the airport to the Line 1 "Y-Griega" Metro Station.

Water

Economy

Monterrey is a major industrial center in northern Mexico, with a GDP (PPP) of US$140 billion and a GDP (PPP) per capita of US$31,900 in 2015. The city was rated by Fortune magazine in 1999 as the best city in Latin America for business and is currently ranked third best by the América Economía magazine.

The city has prominent positions in sectors such as steel, cement, glass, auto parts, and brewing. The city's economic wealth has been attributed in part to its proximity to the United States-Mexico border and economic links to the United States.

Industrialization was accelerated in the mid-19th century by the Compañia Fundidora de Fierro y Acero Monterrey, a steel-processing company. Today, Monterrey is home to transnational conglomerates such as Cemex (the world's third largest cement company), FEMSA (Coca-Cola Latin America, largest independent Coca-Cola bottler in the world), Alfa (petrochemicals, food, telecommunications and auto parts), Axtel (telecommunications), Vitro (glass), Selther (leading mattress and rest systems firm in Latin America), Gruma (food), and Banorte (financial services). The FEMSA corporation owned a large brewery, the Cuauhtémoc Moctezuma Brewery (Cervecería Cuauhtémoc Moctezuma) that produces the brands Sol, Tecate, Indio, Dos Equis and Carta Blanca among others, in the beginning of the year Cuauhtémoc Moctezuma Brewery was sold to Dutch-based company Heineken. By the end of the same year, there were more than 13,000 manufacturing companies, 55,000 retail stores, and more than 52,000 service firms in Monterrey.

The metals sector, dominated by iron and steel, accounted for 6 percent of manufacturing GNP in 1994. Mexico's steel industry is centered in Monterrey, where the country's first steel mills opened in 1903. Steel processing plants in Monterrey, privatized in 1986, accounted for about half of Mexico's total steel output in the early 1990s.

Monterrey was ranked 94th worldwide and fifth in Latin America in terms of Quality of Life according to Mercer Human Resource Consulting (2006), and was ranked second in 2005 and fourth in 2006, according to América Economía.

Some of the shopping malls in the city include Paseo San Pedro, Paseo La Fe, Plaza Fiesta San Agustín, Galerías Monterrey, and Galerías Valle Oriente.

In March 2023, Tesla announced that it would build a new gigafactory—Gigafactory Mexico—near Monterrey.  The factory will be a ~US$10 billion dollar investment, and will employ thousands of workers when fully operational, as well as employ many thousands of workers during construction.

Culture
The 2007 Universal Forum of Cultures was an international cultural event held in Monterrey from September 20 to December 8, 2007.

Cuisine

The most traditional dish from Monterrey is cabrito, kid goat cooked on embers. Other local dishes and customs that perhaps date back to the Crypto-Judaism of Monterrey's founding families are the "semita" (bread without leavening), the capirotada dessert (a mix of cooked bread, cheese, raisins, peanuts, and crystallized sugarcane juice), and the relative absence of pork dishes. Another famous local dish is machacado con huevo.

Carne asada on weekends remains a tradition among Monterrey families. It is usually served with grilled onions, baked potatoes and sausages or chopped as tacos. Locally brewed beer and cola are an almost mandatory part of the weekly ritual. "Glorias" and "obleas," made from goat milk, are both traditional Nuevo León desserts.

Monterrey has a wide gastronomic variety due to its climate geography, climate, texture, a mixture of ethnics groups, and their influences, a series of unique dishes have been created through more than 400 years of history.

Contemporary music

Since the 1960s, Monterrey has been known for "Norteño" music. Bands like Ramon Ayala, Pesado, Duelo and other Mexican "regional" bands perform at the clubs. Monterrey has witnessed the birth of several bands that have become internationally acclaimed. Their genres vary considerably. Bands include Plastilina Mosh, Control Machete, Kinky, El Gran Silencio, Celso Pina, Jumbo, Division Minuscula, Genitallica, 3Ball MTY, The Warning, GAMA, Los Claxons. The song "Los Oxidados" by Plastilina Mosh opened the 2005 movie Mr. & Mrs. Smith.

Landmarks

 The Santa Lucía artificial river, built between 1996 and 2007. It currently joins the Macroplaza with the Fundidora Park.
 The Cerro de la Silla (Saddle Mountain).
 The Macroplaza, the 8th largest city square in the world, is the cultural and administrative heart of the city featuring remarkable monuments, green areas and buildings.
 Faro del Comercio (Lighthouse of Commerce), another trademark of the city. This monument beams a green laser around the city at night.
 Barrio Antiguo (lit. Old neighborhood or old town) is the historical urban center of the city of Monterrey. There are preserved houses from the 17th, 18th and 19th centuries. Nowadays bars, cafes, art galleries and restaurants can be found there. In November of every year the Festival Cultural Barrio Antiguo takes place with national and international artists and performers. In recent years this festival has been replaced with the Festival Internacional de Santa Lucia, which now takes place in September.
 The Museum of Modern Art is a post-modern Mexican architecture designed by Ricardo Legorreta with the objective of creating different ambiances for artists and visitors from all around the world.
 Monterrey's Inukshuk is one of only a handful of authentic examples to be found outside Canada of these stone monuments from the high Arctic. The sculpture was created in situ by the renowned Inuit artist Bill Nasogaluak in 2007 and was a gift to the state of Nuevo León from the Canadian Chamber of Commerce and the Government of Canada.
 Fundidora Park is a large urban park that contains old foundry buildings, 120 hectares of natural ambiance, artificial lakes, playgrounds, alternative cinema (Cineteca), museum (Photo Collection, the State Plastic Arts Collection, Exhibits and Spaces), hotel, auditorium and convention center.
 Puente de la Unidad (sometimes called Puente Atirantado) is a suspension bridge that crosses the Santa Catarina River and joins San Pedro Garza García with Monterrey.
 The Alfa Planetarium is the first IMAX dome built in Latin America and fourth in the world.
 The Government Palace of Nuevo León is a pink marble of Neoclassical architecture where the governor's office is located.
 El Cerro del Obispado (Bishopric Hill) which includes a public, scenic lookout called Mirador del Obispado, a Monumental flag and the museum inside the Palacio del Obispado (the Bishopric Palace).
 ITESM, ITESM has two distinctive buildings CEDES which houses the administration of the ITESM nationwide system and the CETEC which houses the main computer classroom and other offices.
 Cuauhtémoc Moctezuma Brewery (Cervecería Cuauhtémoc Moctezuma), with its 19th-century buildings and where the national Baseball Hall of Fame (Salón de la Fama) is located.
 On the way to the Cola de Caballo waterfall (Carretera Nacional going to Ciudad Victoria, Tamaulipas), in Santiago, the Presa Rodrigo Gomez or "La Boca" ("La Boca" Dam) lays nested between green hills.
 The Museum of Mexican History is the most representative and visited museum of the North of the Republic, fulfilling its purpose of spreading the historical content of the Mexican cultural heritage.
 LABNL Lab Cultural Ciudadano is a citizen laboratory located in the center of the city. This public space of collective creation develops projects for the common benefit of local communities.

Media
Monterrey is an important producer and broadcaster of media and entertainment in Mexico. Grupo Multimedios operates 4 television channels in the city, and XHAW-TDT is the flagship of the near-national network Canal 6, which also airs as a cable network in the United States. National broadcasting networks Televisa and Azteca have local stations for all of their major channels, along with the non-commercial broadcasters such as Once and Canal 22 networks. The state of Nuevo León and UANL also maintain television stations.

Grupo Reforma, one of the most widely read newsources in Mexico originated in the city with the newspaper El Norte. Milenio Diario de Monterrey, published by Grupo Multimedios, is another newspaper of high distribution, daily printing local editions in the most important Mexican cities. Other local newspapers include El Porvenir, El Horizonte, and ABC. Northern Mexico's weekly business newspaper Biznews is also headquartered in Monterrey.

Monterrey also has several radio stations broadcasting news, music, entertainment, and culture for the city. The main radio broadcasting groups are Multimedios Radio, Grupo Radio Alegría and Nucleo Radio Monterrey.

Sports
The city hosted 8 matches during the 1986 FIFA World Cup. The city will host matches during the 2026 FIFA World Cup. The FINA World Junior Swimming Championships were held in Monterrey in the summer of 2008 at the University of Nuevo Leon (UANL), after the completion of a world-class and FINA-approved Aquatic Center. Also the city wanted to bid for the 2016 Summer Olympics, but the Mexican Olympic Committee refused to support it. Backed by a young people's movement, students of the universities of Monterrey formed the Monterrey 2014 Foundation with the purpose of hosting the 2014 Summer Youth Olympics. In 2009, the Mexican Olympic Committee gave the bid to Guadalajara which later on withdrew the bid late January 2010. Monterrey was bidding for the 2018 Summer Youth Olympics. Again, in February 2012, the Mexican Olympic Committee chose Guadalajara as a candidate for the 2018 Summer Youth Olympics, but was eliminated by the International Olympic Committee to advance to the final round. Since then, the Foundation Monterrey Olympic City A.C., the new name of this group of young citizens, are working on a project bid for the 2023 Summer Youth Olympics and then apply for the 2028 Summer Olympics.

Monterrey has two football teams in the Mexican league. The C.F. Monterrey, commonly known as the Rayados del Monterrey, uses the Estadio BBVA Bancomer, a facility sponsored by BBVA Bancomer and other important businesses. The Tigres UANL, owned by CEMEX, host matches at Estadio Universitario, on the main campus of the UANL. Both teams are related to the city on the derby, called Clásico Regiomontano. During the match, most of the city watches in bars, clubs, and family homes. It was proposed to build a stadium for both teams, the "Estadio Internacional Monterrey", but both teams rejected the idea. The project is still being promoted, but the UANL Tigres have yet to finish their stadium contract and the Rayados just inaugurated a new stadium of their own. Club de Fútbol Monterrey recently opened a new stadium with a capacity of 50,000. It was scheduled to be finished by 2014, named "Estadio de Fútbol Monterrey", but was inaugurated on August 2, 2015, in a match with Benfica FC. Rayados won, 3–0. Before the inauguration, the name was changed to Estadio BBVA Bancomer. It will remain the club's property for 50 years before becoming government property.

In addition, two professional indoor soccer teams were hosted in the past, the Monterrey La Raza, members of the Continental Indoor Soccer League and World Indoor Soccer League and the Monterrey Fury, members of the Major Indoor Soccer League. The city was awarded another franchise to begin play in the fall of 2007 in the MISL.

Baseball has a long history in the city, where it became the most popular sport during the early 20th century. Monterrey has been champion of the Little League World Series three times (1957, 1958 and 1997), and has been host of Major League Baseball games. The Sultanes de Monterrey are a Mexican League baseball team in the Northern Division. They have won the national title several times. The team was formed May 20, 1939, as Carta Blanca (a local beer brand, owned by Cuauhtémoc Moctezuma Brewery which owned the team). The team was also known as the gray ghosts. Soon, they became one of the most important teams in the league, winning its first championship in 1943. The Sultanes play in the Estadio de Béisbol Monterrey, the largest baseball stadium in Mexico. In 2003, the city unsuccessfully attempted to buy (and relocate to Monterrey) the Montreal Expos franchise of Major League Baseball.

There are two professional basketball teams: Fuerza Regia that plays in the national league, Liga Nacional de Baloncesto Profesional, and the Monterrey Venom that plays in the minor league American Basketball Association. Fuerza Regia used to play at the Monterrey Arena and now is doing this at Gimnasio Nuevo León while the Monterrey Poison plays at the gymnasium of the ITESM. The city has hosted the Champ Car race in Fundidora Park from 2001 to 2005 and hosted the A1 Grand Prix of Nations in February 2006.

In 2004, Monterrey hosted the World Karate Federation Senior World Championships. In April 2004, Monterrey's Arena Monterrey became the first city to host WWE in Mexico. In 2007, Monterrey hosted the Women's WTBA World Tenpin Bowling Championships. The city has two college American football teams, the Auténticos Tigres UANL and the Borregos Salvajes (ITESM) that play in the National College League (ONEFA). There is also a local children's league called AFAIM. People can also find golf, fishing, camping, and extreme-sports outdoors near the city (bungee jumping at Cola de Caballo, rock-climbing, hiking, mountain bike). In particular there is international-level rock-climbing places like la Huasteca, Potrero Chico and many other canyons.

Starting 2009 the Monterrey Open has been held at Monterrey. It is a professional women's tennis tournament affiliated with the Women's Tennis Association (WTA), and is part of the International tournaments on the WTA Tour. The Monterrey Open was also a golf tournament on the U.S.-based second tier professional Nike Tour, later named the Nationwide Tour and the Korn Ferry Tour, from 1993 to 2001. It was played at the Club Campestre in San Pedro Garza García, a suburb of Monterrey. In 2010, Monterrey hosted the International Ice Hockey Federation World U18 Championship at the Monterrey Ice Complex. Centauros Rugby Club Monterrey was founded in 2010 and is affiliated with the FMRU (Federacion Mexicana de Rugby).

Notable people
 

Selma Oxor (born 1989), singer-songwriter

Twin towns – sister cities

Monterrey is twinned with:

 Barcelona, Spain (1992)
 Bethlehem, Palestine (1999)
 Bilbao, Spain (1993)
 Cape Town, South Africa (2016)
 Concepción, Chile (1997)
 Dallas, United States (1992)
 Guatemala City, Guatemala (1998)
 Hamilton, Canada (1993)
 Iași, Romania (1993)
 McAllen, United States (1999)
 Medellín, Colombia (1996)
 Monterrei, Spain (1999)
 Olongapo, Philippines (1993)
 Orlando, United States (2002)
 Rosario, Argentina (1993)
 San Antonio, United States (1953)
 San Salvador, El Salvador (1996)
 Shenyang, China (2015)
 Surabaya, Indonesia (2001)

See also

 List of tallest buildings in Monterrey

References

Further reading

 Michael Snodgrass, Deference and Defiance in Monterrey: Workers, Paternalism, and Revolution in Mexico, 1890–1950 (Cambridge University Press, 2003)

External links

 Government of the City of Monterrey

 
Cities in Mexico
Monterrey metropolitan area

Capitals of states of Mexico
Populated places established in 1596
1596 establishments in New Spain
1590s establishments in Mexico
1596 in New Spain